Winchester Cathedral Christmas Market is a Christmas market held each year in the grounds of Winchester Cathedral, in the city of Winchester in the English county of Hampshire. Typically the market operates from the middle of November until a few days before Christmas Day. In 2022, it will run from Friday 18 November 18 to Thursday 22 December. 

The market was founded in 2006, and has operated every year since with the exception of 2020, when it was cancelled due to the coronavirus pandemic.

The market hosts around 120 German-inspired chalets, selling a range of seasonal gifts, food and drink. Originally these were complemented by an outdoor ice rink, but from 2021 that was replaced by a performance stage that hosts a variety of performances. Access to the market is free of change and no pre-booking is required, but queues may develop at busy times.

References

External links
Christmas Market page on Winchester Cathedral web site

Annual events in England
Christmas markets in the United Kingdom
Crafts
Recurring events established in 2006
Retail markets in England
2006 establishments in England
Winchester